Sex After Kids is a 2013 Canadian comedy film written and directed by Jeremy Lalonde. The film features an ensemble cast, and depicts various ways in which adults struggle to reconcile their sex lives with the demands of parenthood.

Plot 
The film features an ensemble cast of characters, including Lou (Zoie Palmer), a single mother being encouraged by her brother Peyton (Paul Amos) to pursue casual sex; Larissa (Mary Krohnert) and Jody (Kate Hewlett), a lesbian couple whose relationship is being tested by frequent disagreements; Horton (Jay Brazeau) and Dolores (Mimi Kuzyk), middle-aged empty nesters trying to rekindle their sex lives after their adult daughter Markee (Katie Boland) moves out on her own; Gage (Kris Holden-Ried), a single father looking unsuccessfully for a perfect match; Vanessa (Amanda Brugel) and Sean (Peter Keleghan), a couple troubled by the fact that Sean now sees Vanessa as a mother rather than a sexual being; and Jules (Shannon Beckner) and Ben (Ennis Esmer), a couple struggling to revive their sex life after a year pause caused by having a baby. Gordon Pinsent appears as a sex therapist.

Background and release 
The film was funded in part by a crowdfunding campaign on Indiegogo, which raised over $61,000 from 345 donors.

The film premiered on January 26, 2013 at the Santa Barbara International Film Festival, and was screened at numerous Canadian film festivals, including the Calgary International Film Festival, the Edmonton International Film Festival and the Cinéfest Sudbury International Film Festival.

References

External links
 

2013 films
2010s sex comedy films
2010s English-language films
Canadian LGBT-related films
2013 LGBT-related films
LGBT-related sex comedy films
Indiegogo projects
Canadian sex comedy films
English-language Canadian films
Crowdfunded films
Films directed by Jeremy Lalonde
2013 comedy films
2010s Canadian films